Kevin Alexander (born July 1, 1987) is a former American football linebacker. He was signed by the Denver Broncos as an undrafted free agent in 2010. He played college football at Clemson.

Early years
Alexander attended Union County High School in Lake Butler, Florida. He made 282 tackles, 19 sacks and three interceptions in his high school football career, with 115 tackles and nine sacks as a senior.

He committed to Clemson University, and had scholarship offers from the University of Louisville, the University of Maryland, Auburn University, and the University of Tennessee.

College career
Alexander was moved from linebacker to Clemson's bandit end position in the 2007 preseason. He was later moved back to outside linebacker.

Professional career
Alexander was signed by the Denver Broncos as an undrafted free agent following the 2010 NFL Draft on April 26, 2010. He was waived during final cuts on September 5, 2010, but was re-signed to the team's practice squad on September 6. He was promoted to the active roster on October 16. He made his NFL debut on October 17 against the New York Jets in week 6. Alexander played in eight games in 2010 before he was waived on December 20 to make room for cornerback Chevis Jackson.

Personal
Alexander's brother, Bennie, played cornerback for the Florida Gators.

Alexander was arrested on December 20, 2010, hours before he was waived by the Broncos, on domestic violence charges. He allegedly assaulted his girlfriend the night before. A court date was scheduled for December 22.

References

External links
Denver Broncos bio
Clemson Tigers football bio

1987 births
Living people
People from Lake Butler, Florida
Players of American football from Florida
American football defensive ends
American football linebackers
Clemson Tigers football players
Denver Broncos players